Cardisoma carnifex is a species of terrestrial crab found in coastal regions from the east coast of Africa and the Red Sea across the Indo-Pacific to the Line Islands and the Tuamotu Archipelago. The range includes parts of northern Australia and the Cocos (Keeling) Islands.

References

External links 
 
 

Grapsoidea
Terrestrial crustaceans
Arthropods of Kenya
Crustaceans described in 1794